Steindachnerina is a genus of toothless characins from South America, with 24 currently described species:
 Steindachnerina amazonica (Steindachner, 1911)
 Steindachnerina argentea (T. N. Gill, 1858) (stout sardine)
 Steindachnerina atratoensis (C. H. Eigenmann, 1912)
 Steindachnerina bimaculata (Steindachner, 1876)
 Steindachnerina binotata (N. E. Pearson, 1924)
 Steindachnerina biornata (Braga & Azpelicueta, 1987)
 Steindachnerina brevipinna (C. H. Eigenmann & R. S. Eigenmann, 1889)
 Steindachnerina conspersa (Holmberg, 1891)
 Steindachnerina corumbae Pavanelli & Britski, 1999
 Steindachnerina dobula (Günther, 1868)
 Steindachnerina elegans (Steindachner, 1875)
 Steindachnerina fasciata (Vari & Géry, 1985)
 Steindachnerina gracilis Vari & Williams Vari, 1989
 Steindachnerina guentheri (C. H. Eigenmann & R. S. Eigenmann, 1889)
 Steindachnerina hypostoma (Boulenger, 1887)
 Steindachnerina insculpta (Fernández-Yépez, 1948)
 Steindachnerina leucisca (Günther, 1868)
 Steindachnerina notograptos Lucinda & Vari, 2009
 Steindachnerina notonota (A. Miranda-Ribeiro, 1937)
 Steindachnerina planiventris Vari & Williams Vari, 1989
 Steindachnerina pupula Vari, 1991
 Steindachnerina quasimodoi Vari & Williams Vari, 1989
 Steindachnerina seriata Netto-Ferreira & Vari, 2011
 Steindachnerina varii Géry, Planquette & Le Bail, 1991

References
 

Curimatidae
Fish of South America
Taxa named by Henry Weed Fowler